Pamukluk Dam is a hydroelectric plant in Mersin Province, southern Turkey. Currently, it is under construction and about 84 percent of the construction has already been completed.

Location
The dam is at Çamlıyayla and Tarsus ilçes of Mersin Province. It is on Pamukluk River, a tributary of Berdan River.

Details
When completed, the capacity of the reservoir will be . It will irrigate  and will produce 68 million KW-hour of electrical energy. Its water will also be used as drinking water in many towns and villages. Its contribution to Turkish economy will be 131 million Turkish lira.

References

Dams in Mersin Province
Tarsus District
Dams under construction in Turkey